The Baseball Reliquary is a nonprofit educational organization "dedicated to fostering an appreciation of American art and culture through the context of baseball history and to exploring the national pastime’s unparalleled creative possibilities." The Reliquary was founded in 1996 in Monrovia, California and is funded in part by a grant from the Los Angeles County Department of Arts and Culture.

The Reliquary organizes and presents artistic and historical exhibitions relating to baseball each year. Throughout its two-decade history, the Reliquary has held exhibitions on varied topics relating to the cultural impact of baseball, including: "Legacies: Baseball from Flatbush to the City of Angels," a variety of artistic interpretations of the 1958 move of the Brooklyn Dodgers to Los Angeles (2004); the photographic exhibition “Another Trip in Baseball’s Time Machine: Photography at the Field of Dreams,” highlighting the relationship between photography and baseball (2013); and “A Swinging Centennial: Jackie Robinson at 100,” a musical event that featured a performance of “Stealin’ Home,” Bobby Bradford’s tribute to Jackie Robinson, commissioned by the Reliquary (2019). Since 1999, the Reliquary has maintained an “alternate hall-of-fame” called the Shrine of the Eternals and presented other baseball-related awards annually.

History and mission

The Baseball Reliquary is a nonprofit educational institution that is "dedicated to fostering an appreciation of American art and culture through the context of baseball history and to exploring the national pastime’s unparalleled creative possibilities." The Reliquary was founded in 1996 by Terry Cannon, a creative artist and assistant school librarian who describes himself as “meek and mild-mannered [on the outside] … a rabble-rouser and non-conformist [at heart].” In its early years, the Reliquary had no physical home; instead it collaborated with local institutions including public and university libraries and the Jackie Robinson Center.

Beginning in 1999, the Reliquary created a hall-of-fame style historical commemoration of baseball notables called the Shrine of the Eternals. Rather than focusing on statistical accomplishments as does the National Baseball Hall of Fame and Museum in Cooperstown, New York, the Shrine “seek[s] out aspects of this history that have been overlooked or have not been explored in depth as well as players and others in baseball who have had unconventional careers.”  The Reliquary and its Shrine have been described as “a haven for legends like Marvin Miller and Spaceman Lee, umpires like Emmett Ashford and Pam Postema … mostly renegades who did not meet the precise standards of the [National] Baseball Hall of Fame.” Some view the Shrine of the Eternals as a more welcome recognition of their contributions to baseball than even the Hall of Fame.

The Reliquary has recognized three inductees each year since the Shrine's inception. Members of the Reliquary receive a ballot of 50 candidates for the Shrine each year, and the top three vote-getters by percentage are installed. As of the 2019 Shrine election, there were more than 300 voting members.

In 2001, the Reliquary began recognizing “distinguished service by a baseball fan” with the Hilda Award, named for famed Brooklyn Dodgers fan Hilda Chester. In 2002, the Tony Salin Memorial Award was established “to honor individuals for their work in preserving baseball history.” Each of these honors is awarded annually.

In 2013, documentary filmmaker Jon Leonoudakis released a 69 minute film about the Reliquary titled Not Exactly Cooperstown. The film premiered at the 8th Annual Baseball Film Festival at the National Baseball Hall of Fame and Museum in Cooperstown on 29 September 2013. The film was also featured at the St. Louis International Film Festival in November 2014.

In January 2015, the Reliquary found a permanent home for its collections and events with the opening of the Institute for Baseball Studies at Whittier College in Whittier, California. Housed on the third floor of the College’s Mendenhall building, the Institute is open to students and the public for research and viewing of the Reliquary’s growing collection.

Shrine of the Eternals

Since 1999, members of the Baseball Reliquary have elected three individuals annually to their "Shrine of the Eternals." The Shrine is similar in concept to the annual elections held at the Baseball Hall of Fame, but differs philosophically in that statistical accomplishment is not a criterion for election. Rather, the Shrine’s annual ballot is composed of individuals – from the obscure to the well known – who have altered the baseball world in ways that supersede statistics. The definition of "individuals" is not restricted to humans; the 2017 induction class included the Peanuts character Charlie Brown.

The Baseball Reliquary lists the criteria for election to the Shrine of the Eternals as:
 the distinctiveness of play (good or bad)
 the uniqueness of character and personality
 the imprint that the individual has made upon the baseball landscape

Inductees (as of 2020)

Jim Abbott (2003)
Dick Allen (2004)
Roger Angell (2010)
Emmett Ashford (2008)
Billy Beane (2019)
Moe Berg (2000)
Sy Berger (2015)
Yogi Berra (2007)
Steve Bilko (2015)
Ila Borders (2003)
Jim Bouton (2001)
Jim Brosnan (2007)
Charlie Brown (2017)
Bill Buckner (2008)
Glenn Burke (2015)
Roberto Clemente (2004)
Bob Costas (2020)
Steve Dalkowski (2009)
Dizzy Dean (2014)
Rod Dedeaux (2005)
Jim Eisenreich (2009)
Dock Ellis (1999)
Nancy Faust (2018)
Eddie Feigner (2013)
Lisa Fernandez (2019)
Mark Fidrych (2002)
Curt Flood (1999)
Rube Foster (2020)
Ted Giannoulas (2011)
Josh Gibson (2006)
Jim "Mudcat" Grant (2012)
Pete Gray (2011)
Arnold Hano (2016)
William "Dummy" Hoy (2004)
Bo Jackson (2016)
Shoeless Joe Jackson (2002)
Bill James (2007)
Dr. Frank Jobe (2012)
 Tommy John (2018)
Bill "Spaceman" Lee (2000)
Roger Maris (2009)
Marvin Miller (2003)
Minnie Miñoso (2002)
Manny Mota (2013)
Don Newcombe (2016)
Lefty O’Doul (2013)
Buck O’Neil (2008)
Satchel Paige (2001)
Max Patkin (2020)
Jimmy Piersall (2001)
Pam Postema (2000)
J. R. Richard (2019)
Jackie Robinson (2005)
Rachel Robinson (2014)
Lester Rodney (2005)
Pete Rose (2010)
Vin Scully (2017)
Rusty Staub (2018)
Casey Stengel (2010)
Luis Tiant (2012)
Bob Uecker (2017)
Fernando Valenzuela (2006)
Bill Veeck, Jr. 
Maury Wills (2011)
Kenichi Zenimura (2006)
Don Zimmer (2014)

Sources:"Shrine of the Eternals (Alphabetical List of Inductees)" Baseball Reliquary website

Hilda Award

Named in memory of legendary Brooklyn Dodgers baseball fan Hilda Chester, the Hilda Award recognizes distinguished service by a baseball fan. The award is an old cowbell, Hilda Chester’s signature noisemaker. The Hilda is awarded annually, on the Shrine of the Eternals Induction Day.

Recipients (as of 2019)

Rea Wilson (2001)
Seth Hawkins (2002)
Ruth Roberts (2003)
Jennie Reiff (2004)
David Fletcher (2005)
Bill Murray (2006)
Cass Sapir (2007)
John Adams (2008)
Bob Colleary (2009)
Sister Mary Assumpta Zabas (2010)

Chris Erskine (2011)
Arnold Hano (2012)
Emma Amaya (2013)
Jerry Pritikin (2014)
Tom Keefe (2015)
Tom Derry (2016)
Cam Perron (2017)
Bart Wilhelm (2018)
Ralph Carhart (2019)

Source:"Hilda Award Recipients" Baseball Reliquary website

Tony Salin Memorial Award
In 2002, the Reliquary established the Tony Salin Memorial Award, after the baseball historian and researcher of that name, to honor individuals for their work in preserving baseball history.

Recipients (as of 2019)

 Peter Golenbock (2002)
 David Nemec (2003)
 Bill Weiss (2004)
 Richard Beverage (2005)
 Kerry Yo Nakagawa (2006)
 Mark Rucker (2007)
 David W. Smith (2008)
 Mike Shannon (2009)
 Stew Thornley (2010)

 Paul Dickson (2011)
 Dave Kelly (2012)
 Steve Bandura (2013)
 Jerry Cohen (2014)
 Gary Joseph Cieradkowski (2015)
 Neetalie Williams (2016)
 Richard Santillan (2017)
 Ross Altman (2018)
 Bob Busser (2019)

Source:"Tony Salin Memorial Award Recipients" Baseball Reliquary website

See also
Nisei Baseball Research Project

References

External links
Baseball Reliquary homepage
 New York Times - "A Hall of Fame for Great Stories"

Baseball museums and halls of fame
Halls of fame in California
Baseball culture
History of baseball
Organizations established in 1996
1996 establishments in California
Awards established in 1996